The women's 1500 meter at the 2021 KNSB Dutch Single Distance Championships in Heerenveen took place at Thialf ice skating rink on Friday 30 October 2020.

Statistics

Result

Source:

Referee: Wycher Bos.  Starter: Raymond Micka.  Assistant: Björn Fetlaar 
Start: 30-10-2020 13:50:00hr. Finish: 30-10-2020 14:13:17hr

Draw

References 

Single Distance Championships
2021 Single Distance
World